Julia Mary Yeomans  (born 15 October 1954) is a British theoretical physicist active in the fields of soft condensed matter and biological physics. She has served as Professor of Physics at the University of Oxford since 2002.

Early life and education
Yeomans was born on 15 October 1954 in Derby, Derbyshire, England. She was educated at the University of Oxford where she was an undergraduate student of Somerville College, Oxford, for her BA and a postgraduate student at Wolfson College, Oxford. She was awarded a Doctor of Philosophy degree in theoretical physics in 1979. where her doctoral research on critical phenomena in spin models was supervised by Robin Stinchcombe.

Research and career
After two years of working as a postdoctoral researcher at Cornell University with Michael E. Fisher, she was appointed a lecturer at the Department of Physics at the University of Southampton in 1981. In 1983, she moved to the University of Oxford where she became a professor in 2002.

Yeomans is a professor at the Rudolf Peierls centre for theoretical physics. Her research investigates theoretical modelling of processes in complex fluids including liquid crystals, drops on hydrophobic surfaces, microchannels, as well as bacteria.

Yeomans' research was presented for a younger and more general audience in Nature's Raincoats: Bio-inspired surface science at the Royal Society summer science exhibition in 2009.

Awards and honours
In 2012, Yeomans was awarded a European Research Council advanced research grant for her research proposal Microflow in complex environments. She was elected a Fellow of the Royal Society (FRS) in 2013, where her nomination reads:

In 2021 she received the Sam Edwards Medal and Prize from the Institute of Physics, for her contributions to soft and active matter, statistical physics and biophysics.

Personal life
Yeomans married chemistry professor Peter Hore in 1990.

References

British physicists
British women physicists
Alumni of Somerville College, Oxford
People educated at Manchester High School for Girls
Fellows of St Hilda's College, Oxford
Female Fellows of the Royal Society
Living people
1954 births
Fellows of the Royal Society
Fellows of the Institute of Physics